Jacob Anderson (born 1990) is a British actor, singer-songwriter, rapper, and record producer.

Jacob Anderson may also refer to:

 Jacob Anderson (field hockey) (born 1997), Australian field hockey player
 Jacob Anderson (priest) (died 1962), Canadian Anglican priest
 Jacob Anderson, frat president involved in Baylor University sexual assault scandal

See also
Jacob Andersen (disambiguation)
Jake Anderson (disambiguation)
Jacob Anderson-Minshall (born 1967), American author and LGBTQ activist
Jacob Andersson (born 1995), Swedish ice hockey player